Panochthus is an extinct genus of glyptodont, which lived in the Gran Chaco-Pampean region of Argentina (Lujan, Yupoí and Agua Blanca Formations), Brazil (Jandaíra Formation), Bolivia (Tarija and Ñuapua Formations), Paraguay and Uruguay (Sopas and Dolores Formations) during the Pleistocene epoch.

It could reach  in length and a weight up to  the upper skull and the body were protected by hemispherical armor composed of hundreds of rounded scales. The tail, short and wedge-shaped, consisted of small bony bands with small spikes used for defense. Preserved tracheal rings are known from one specimen.

Gallery

See also 

 Doedicurus

References

Further reading 
 Dinosaur Encyclopedia by Jayne Parsons

External links 

Prehistoric cingulates
Prehistoric placental genera
Pleistocene mammals of South America
Lujanian
Ensenadan
Uquian
Pleistocene xenarthrans
Pleistocene Argentina
Fossils of Argentina
Pleistocene Bolivia
Fossils of Bolivia
Pleistocene Brazil
Fossils of Brazil
Pleistocene Paraguay
Fossils of Paraguay
Pleistocene Uruguay
Fossils of Uruguay
Paraná Basin
Fossil taxa described in 1866
Taxa named by Hermann Burmeister